Christopher Burkett (born 1951) is an American landscape photographer, known not only for his large format photography of woodlands but also as a craftsman who "makes every print himself with a skill that is unsurpassed"

Photography
Burkett requires "absolute material accuracy" and has since 1980 evolved into one of the greatest color printers in the history of the medium, creating Cibachrome color prints of unprecedented dimension (40x50) from his brilliant 8x10 transparencies.  "The best of Christopher Burkett's photographs have an almost mystical sense of connection to us, one that cannot fully be conveyed through words or reproductions. "All of Christopher's photographs, is able to act across distance, to illumine a viewer standing fifty or a hundred feet away, to transcend the physical dimensions of its frame."

Burkett is also a former brother in an Orthodox Christian religious order who, Vincent Rossi writes, has "transformed photographic technique into a spiritual endeavor."

On April 15, 2018 the PBS national network broadcast a segment about Burkett on NewsHour Weekend. The program states: "There are some photographers who are convinced that the old ways are worth preserving. One of these is Oregon Photographer Christopher Burkett, who works slowly and patiently to create some of the highest resolution photographs every made. Christopher Burkett has been photographing the American landscape for over four decades." "He and his wife, Ruth, have lugged their camera gear across all 50 states."  "He says he want to make both the physical and the ethereal accessible."  "Light and luminosity are critical elements of Burkett's work."  "For Burkett, photography is not just an artistic but a spiritual experience that's informed by his religious faith."  And Burkett says: "...going out and photographing is one thing, but spending time bringing the light out of these images to share them with other people is really what it’s all about."

Reviews and awards
Burkett's books and exhibits have been reviewed in the Bloomsbury Review, San Diego Union-Tribune, The Washington Post, and Book Reader; an interview with Burkett was published in View Camera magazine. Articles about Burkett have also appeared in Camera Arts, Hasselblad Forum, and Popular Photography. The North American Bookdealers Exchange awarded Burkett's book Intimations of Paradise Best Book of the Year for Art and Photography in 1999 and in 2004 he was one of twelve photographers honored with the Hasselblad Masters award for his photography by camera manufacturer Hasselblad.

Life
Burkett was born in 1951, grew up in the Pacific Northwest, and now lives in Oregon. He joined a Christian religious brotherhood in the early 1970s and, in 1975, first became interested in photography as a form of spiritual expression. In 1979 he left the brotherhood and married his wife, Ruth.

Since then he and his wife are Orthodox. Burkett attends the Church of the Annunciation in Milwaukie, which belongs to the Orthodox Church of America (OCA).

Notes

Bibliography

External links 
Burkett's web site 

1951 births
Nature photographers
Living people
Artists from Oregon
Christian artists
Photographers from Oregon
Eastern Orthodox Christians from the United States